The men's 50 kilometres race walk at the 1978 European Athletics Championships was held in Prague, then Czechoslovakia, on 2 September 1978.

Medalists

Results

Final
2 September

Participation
According to an unofficial count, 36 athletes from 16 countries participated in the event.

 (1)
 (3)
 (3)
 (2)
 (2)
 (1)
 (3)
 (1)
 (2)
 (3)
 (1)
 (3)
 (3)
 (3)
 (2)
 (3)

References

50 kilometres race walk
Racewalking at the European Athletics Championships